The Great Synagogue in  Slonim or simply the Slonim Synagogue is a 17th-century baroque former synagogue building in Slonim, Belarus.Has a status of Historical and Cultural value  of the Republic of Belarus.

History
The synagogue was the main religious building of Slonim's then numerous and influential Jewish community. The building was erected in 1642 and was initially part of the town's fortifications system.

In 1881 the synagogue was heavily damaged in a fire.

During the Second World War, almost the entire Jewish population of Slonim was murdered by the Nazis in the Holocaust. The building was left untouched by the German Luftwaffe during World War II, but has subsequently deteriorated. After the war, the Communist administration used the building as a furniture warehouse.

In 2001, after the restoration of the independence of Belarus, the building was returned to the Belarusian Jewish community.

Current state
The synagogue is standing but in a dilapidated condition.Late December 2020 the individual from Minsk has bought the synagogue at the auction and opened the Saving Heritage foundation  to help the Great synagogue in Slonim to survive.

Restoration project
Under an initiative of the Kaplinsky family, a steering group for the conservation of the synagogue was established through the Foundation for Jewish Heritage to restore the Slonim Synagogue and to make it a “major educational facility, cross-cultural meeting place, memorial, place of worship, and a cultural centre ensuring that the Great Synagogue has a sustainable future”. The steering group includes Britons and Americans with family links to the Jewish community of Slonim and the architect Tszwai So. On 29 December 2020 the Synagogue was sold at public auction to a writer and musician Ilona Ioanna Reeves. In 2022 the writer gave the synagogue

Gallery

See also
 Anshe Slonim Synagogue in the Lower East Side of Manhattan, New York
 Slonim (Hasidic dynasty)

References

Synagogue in Slonim 2021
Slonim synagogue
Slonim synagogue history 

Ioanna Reeves article for “Tsaytshrift” journal of Jewish studies (European Humanities University)
 Slonim Synagogue and Ioanna Reeves

External links

Synagogues in Belarus

Baroque synagogues
17th-century synagogues
Slonim